Korenjak may refer to:

 Korenjak, Zavrč, a village in Slovenia
 Korenjak, Croatia, a village near Maruševec, Croatia